Phyllodactylus leei, also known as the San Cristóbal Island leaf-toed gecko or Chatham leaf-toed gecko, is a species of gecko. It is endemic to San Cristóbal Island in the Galapagos Islands.

References

Phyllodactylus
Endemic reptiles of the Galápagos Islands
Reptiles described in 1889